Treasure Island is a 1973 American animated adventure film directed by Hal Sutherland, produced by Filmation, and released by Warner Bros. In this adaptation of Robert Louis Stevenson's 1883 novel of the same name, Jim Hawkins (voiced by Davy Jones) travels with sidekick Hiccup the Mouse.

In 1980, an edited version of the film was broadcast on NBC as a special.

Plot
Enchanted by the idea of locating treasure buried by Captain Flint, Squire Trelawney, Dr. Livesey and Jim Hawkins charter a sailing voyage to a Caribbean island. Unfortunately, a large number of Flint's old pirate crew are aboard the ship, including Long John Silver.

Voice cast 
 Richard Dawson as Long John Silver
 Davy Jones as Jim Hawkins
 Dal McKennon as Captain Flint, Ben Gunn
 Larry D. Mann as Doctor Livesey
 Larry Storch as Captain Smollett
 Jane Webb as Mrs. Hawkins
 Lou Scheimer as Bearded sailor, pirate (uncredited)

Production
The film was part of Family Classics, a series of films announced to be produced in mid-January 1972, based on concepts in the public domain commissioned by Warner Bros. Production for the film and Oliver Twist had been finished by late 1973. The film's budget amounted to $1,050,000, with the million given by Warner Bros., and the rest put in by the studio itself.

Release
Treasure Island was first broadcast as an NBC Special Treat special on April 29, 1980, with half of the film's runtime cut. The special was hosted by special guest star, Melissa Sue Anderson. The movie was first released on VHS on September 30, 1997, as part of the Warner Bros. Classic Tales series. It was first released on DVD on September 3, 2002, by Warner Home Video, through Warner Bros. Family Entertainment. It was released on VCD in 2005 by Alliance Entertainment Singapore Pte. Ltd.

References

External links
 

Filmation animated films
1973 animated films
1973 films
Animated adventure films
1970s American animated films
Animated films based on novels
Treasure Island films
Warner Bros. animated films
Warner Bros. films
1970s children's animated films
Animated films directed by Hal Sutherland
1970s English-language films
Films produced by Lou Scheimer